Howard County is a county located in the US state of Iowa. As of the 2020 census, the population was 9,469. The county seat is Cresco. The county was founded in 1851; it was named for General Tilghman Ashurst Howard, a Representative of Indiana.

Geography

Major highways
 U.S. Highway 63
 Iowa Highway 9
 Iowa Highway 139

Adjacent counties
Mower County, Minnesota  (northwest)
Fillmore County, Minnesota  (north)
Winnesheik County  (east)
Chickasaw County  (south)
Mitchell County  (west)
Floyd County  (southwest)

Demographics

2020 census
There were 4,314 housing units, of which 3,945 were occupied.

2010 census
There were 4,367 housing units, of which 3,944 were occupied.

2000 census

At the 2000 census, there were 9,932 people, 3,974 households and 2,650 families residing in the county. The population density was 21 per square mile (8/km2). There were 4,327 housing units at an average density of 9 per square mile (4/km2). The racial makeup of the county was 99.06% White, 0.11% Black or African American, 0.15% Native American, 0.17% Asian, 0.08% from other races, and 0.42% from two or more races. 0.55% of the population were Hispanic or Latino of any race.

There were 3,974 households, of which 31.1% had children under the age of 18 living with them, 56.8% were married couples living together, 6.6% had a female householder with no husband present, and 33.3% were non-families. 29.5% of all households were made up of individuals, and 15.6% had someone living alone who was 65 years of age or older. The average household size was 2.43 and the average family size was 3.03.

26.30% of the population were under the age of 18, 6.8% from 18 to 24, 25.4% from 25 to 44, 21.3% from 45 to 64, and 20.1% who were 65 years of age or older. The median age was 40 years. For every 100 females there were 97.0 males. For every 100 females age 18 and over, there were 96.3 males.

The median household income was $34,641 and the median family income was $43,284. Males had a median income of $28,856 compared $21,367 for females. The per capita income for the county was $17,842. About 5.6% of families and 9.3% of the population were below the poverty line, including 8.7% of those under age 18 and 8.8% of those age 65 or over.

Events
The Mighty Howard County Fair is held annually in Cresco, in the last full week of June. This celebration originated in 1858, and three fairs were celebrated before being interrupted by the American Civil War. They resumed from 1866 through 1899, and were resumed in 1923 under aegis of the present directorship.

Communities

Cities

Chester
Cresco
Elma
Lime Springs
Protivin
Riceville

Unincorporated communities

Bonaire
Florenceville
Saratoga
Schley

Townships

 Afton
 Albion
 Chester
 Forest City
 Howard
 Howard Center
 Jamestown
 New Oregon
 Oak Dale
 Paris
 Saratoga
 Vernon Springs

Population ranking
The population ranking of the following table is based on the 2020 census of Howard County.

† county seat

Notable people
Norman Borlaug (1914–2009) - Nobel Peace Prize winner who was raised and went to school in the county.

Politics
Through much of its history Howard County has been a swing county in US presidential elections.

See also

National Register of Historic Places listings in Howard County, Iowa

References

External links

Howard County Development Commission's website
Howard County Government Website

 
1851 establishments in Iowa
Populated places established in 1851